The 2015–16 Miami hurricanes women's basketball team represented the University of Miami during the 2015–16 NCAA Division I women's basketball season. The Hurricanes, led by eleventh-year head coach Katie Meier, play their home games at the BankUnited Center and were members of the Atlantic Coast Conference. They finished the season 24–9, 10–6 in ACC play to finish in a tie for fifth place. They advanced to the quarterfinals of the ACC women's tournament where they lost to Notre Dame. They received an at-large bid of the NCAA women's tournament where they got upset by South Dakota State in the first round.

Roster

Media
All home games and conference road games will be broadcast on WVUM as part of the Miami Hurricanes Learfield Sports contract.

Schedule

|-
!colspan=12 style=| Exhibition

|-
!colspan=12 style=| Non-conference Regular Season

|-
!colspan=12 style=| ACC Regular Season

|-
!colspan=12 style=| ACC Women's Tournament

|-
!colspan=12 style=| NCAA Women's Tournament

Source

Rankings

See also
2015–16 Miami Hurricanes men's basketball team

References

Miami Hurricanes women's basketball seasons
Miami
Miami (FL)